The Mapalé is an Afro-Colombian and Ecuadorian style of dance that was brought over by the slaves, and representing the fishermen after a long day of work. Its name comes from the Cathorops mapale (fish) when they are out of the water. The dance moves are compared with the agility and strength of those who are performing it. From the clothing to the precise moves of the hips and shoulders.  The body movements during the dance are swiftly made to follow the beating of the drums and represent the fish out of the water (men), while the women are the sea.

History 
The Mapalé was born as a song and dance of fishermen's work and how it was performed. They would do this to enjoy the night after finishing their work day. It emerged on the Colombian Caribbean coast, thanks to the cultural influence of Africans trafficked like slaves, who mainly came from Angola. When they managed to flee from their captors they founded quilombos or communities in remote places like Palenque de San Basilio, where they affirmed their cultural heritage. Born in the Caribbean, it was introduced in ancient times along the banks of the Magdalena River. At the moment, it is also danced in Afro-descendants communities of the Pacific From Colombia to Panama all the way down to Peru, including Ecuador.

In its origins the dance of labor was performed at night and accompanied by touches of the yamaró and quitambre drums, the palms of the hands, and singing. Subsequently, there was a transformation of its theme attributing an emphasis of sexual rejoicing and assigning the frenetic evolution that is present today. The current choreography consists of traits from its African essence, both in the costumes which is extremely simple, and in the machete (a work tool used for the fishing process). There are some widespread definitions, some of which indicate that the rhythm comes from a festival because of the abundance of the fish. The Mapalé has strong movements for which you must have good body management and discipline.

Clothing 
Men's wardrobe:

They wear trousers that reach the heels, sometimes adorned with fringes or washers in the mouth of the leg. The costumes, both for men and for women, go according to the dance and may vary from one group to another.

Women's wardrobe:

Usually in black, women wear short skirts with fringes, raffias or small ruffles that adorn the accelerated movement of their hips. They wear flat shoes or go barefoot and wear turbans of flags on their heads.

Dance 
The Mapalé couples dance loose or stuck alternately and it is danced with short steps, very fast rhythm and with constant clapping of the dancers. The cumbia music starts, and the routine begins with forming two rows, one in front of the other and in a confrontation between man and woman to make forward and backward advances. This continues with free and individual exhibition positions of the men with the purpose of pleasing their partners, who take turns responding to the confrontations. The movements are frenetic and with a high content of eroticism. Those of the women are different and express themselves more exciting and erotic. The dancers move quickly and forcefully, jumping, falling, raising their arms, shaking their shoulders and hips, following the rhythm of the drums.

Bibliography 

Colombian styles of dance
Latin American folk dances